Thailand first participated at the World Games in 1981, and has sent athletes to compete in every World Games since then.

Medal tables

Medals by Games

Medals by sport

List of medalists

See also

 Olympics
 Thailand at the Olympics
 Thailand at the Youth Olympics
 Paralympic
 Thailand at the Paralympics
 Asian Games
 Thailand at the Asian Games
 Thailand at the Asian Para Games

 Other
 Thailand at the Universiade

References

External links
 
 

 
Nations at the World Games
World Games